Outlet may refer to:

 Outlet (Antigua newspaper)
 "Outlet" (song), by the American rapper Designer
 Outlet, Ontario, a community in Canada
 Outlet, a connection method used in the Objective-C programming language and environments derived from it
 Outlet, a river that runs out of a lake
 Electrical outlet
 Outlet store or outlet mall
 Pelvic outlet
 The Outlet Company, a defunct retail and broadcasting company